Thomas Best Woodward (1814–1875), M.A. was an Anglican priest in Ireland during the 19th century.

Woodward was born in County Tipperary in 1814 and educated at Trinity College, Dublin. He was Protestant Chaplain in the County Gaol, Downpatrick; and, from 1856 until his death in 1875, the Dean of Down (a maritime county in Ulster Province, Ireland).

Publications
Treatise on the Nature of Man, Regarded as Triune; with an Outline of a Philosophy of Life, Thomas Best Woodward, Hodder & Stoughton, London, 1874, ASIN: B000JVKURS
Works by William Archer Butler, M.A., Late Professor of Moral Philosophy of University of Dublin: I. Sermons Doctrinal and Practical, edited with a memoir of the Author's Life by the Very Rev. Thomas Woodward, M.A., Eighth Edition, William Archer Butler, Thomas Woodward, M.A., Macmillan & Co., London, 1869.

Notes

1814 births
1875 deaths
Deans of Down
Sermon writers
British chaplains
19th-century Irish Anglican priests
Alumni of Trinity College Dublin
People from County Tipperary